Horse Heaven was an unincorporated community in Benton County, Washington, United States, located approximately 13 miles southeast of Prosser in Carter Canyon.  The original community site has been abandoned, and most of it no longer remains.

History
The community, originally known as Bedrock Spring, is located in the Horse Heaven Hills which, according to tradition, were named by James Gordon Kinney. The surrounding hills, once replete with wild horses, were frequently covered with "a perfect sea of the finest bunch-grass".

Horse Heaven had a post office from 1903 to 1932, before travel to nearby Prosser became more common and practical for conducting business.

See also
 Horse Heaven Hills American Viticultural Area
 Horse Heaven, Oregon

References

Horse Heaven Hills
Unincorporated communities in Benton County, Washington
Unincorporated communities in Washington (state)